Park Plaza Hotels & Resorts, formerly Park Plaza International Hotels, Inns and Resorts and commonly known as just Park Plaza, is a hotel chain which runs several hotel groups as franchises. It was established in 1986 as a company and acquired by Olympus Real Estate in 1997. In year 2000, Carlson acquired the Park Plaza Hotels & Resorts as well as sister brand Park Inn. As of 2019, the brands were owned by Radisson Hotel Group (formerly Carlson Hotels).

History

Park Plaza International Hotels, Inns and Resorts was founded as a hotel management company and brand in 1986, by Jonathan R. Read.

In 1994, Park Plaza International licensed the Park Plaza brand to "Park Plaza Hotels Limited" with rights to operate in Belgium, The Netherlands, Luxembourg, the United Kingdom and Israel.

Park Plaza International was acquired by Olympus Hospitality Group, a division of Olympus Real Estate in October 1997. According to The Wall Street Journal, a new parent company of the Park Plaza hotel group, Park Hotels International LLC, was formed as part of the deal. Park Plaza International, at that time owned Park Plaza as well as Park Inn hotel chains.

In June 1998, Park Plaza International, backed by Olympus Real Estate, acquired a controlling stake in Australia-listed company Kemayan Hotels and Leisure (KHL). KHL was renamed into Park Plaza Kemayan immediately.

In July 1999, Park Plaza Worldwide, LLC, acquired 50% rights of the brand art'otel from Dirk Gadeke.

In mid-1999, it was reported that Park Plaza Worldwide formed another joint venture with J.E. Robert Companies (JER), with JER owned 80% stake of the JV. In addition, JER had an option to acquire up to 35% of Park Plaza Worldwide.

In July 1999, Paris Park Plaza Worldwide also announced the opening of Park Plaza Orleans Palace. That hotel was acquired by the joint venture with JER, according to reports.

In 2000, Carlson Companies, via Carlson Hotels (known as Radisson Hotel Group since 2018), acquired the Park Plaza Hotels & Resorts and sister brand Park Inn, by forming a joint venture: Park Hospitality, with Olympus Hospitality Group. Carlson and Olympus also formed a private equity fund Radisson–Olympus Capital Partners, to acquire hotels and convert them to use Carlson Hotels' Regent or Radisson brands.

In 2000, Olympus Hospitality Group also acquired another hotel chain Chalet Susse, and converting them to Fairfield Inn by Marriott, operated by competitor of Carlson, Marriott International.

In 2000, Park Plaza Worldwide, chaired by Read, gave "Park Plaza Hotels Limited" (subsequently renamed "Park Plaza Hotels Europe" and then PPHE Hotel Group) exclusive territorial rights for Park Plaza brand in Europe and the Middle East region.

Park Plaza International LLC, also acquired another hotel brand Rockresorts in August 2000: however, it was sold in the next year.

Carlson acquired the remaining stake of Park Plaza and Park Inn brands, from Olympus Hospitality Group in 2003.  The rights to use the brands in the Asia Pacific, was also bought back from Park Plaza Kemayan in the same year.

Carlson's hospitality business was renamed   Radisson Hotel Group in 2017. A new logo of Park Plaza was announced in 2019.

Sister brands
Park Plaza had sister brands such as Radisson Hotel Group's Radisson, Country Inn & Suites as well as Park Inn. Park Inn was acquired by Carlson Companies along with Park Plaza in 2000.

Park Inn by Radisson

Park Inn by Radisson, formerly Park Inn and Park Inn International, is a midscale group of hotels that had over 130 locations worldwide, as of December 31, 2012.

According to the company itself, it was founded in 1986 in Arizona.

Since 2003, some of the Park Inn hotels were operated by franchisee Rezidor Hotel Group, an associate company of Carlson Companies from 2006 to 2010, and a subsidiary of Carlson, via their wholly owned division Carlson Hotels, from 2010 to 2016. Rezidor acquired the franchise rights of Park Inn brand for EMEA region from 2002.

Footnotes

References

External links
 

 
Hotels established in 1986
Hotel chains in the United States
Radisson Hotel Group brands
Companies based in Scottsdale, Arizona
Privately held companies based in Arizona
1986 establishments in Arizona